Outro may refer to:

 Outro (closing credits), added at the end of a motion picture, television program, or video game to list the cast and crew involved in the production
 Outro (literary), the conclusion or epilogue of a work of literature or journalism 
 Outro (music), ending of a composition and may take the form of a coda
 Outro (concert), recorded music played at the end of a live-music concert

Entertainment
 Outro (album) (2002), the second album by Brazilian composer, singer and producer Jair Oliveira
 "Outro" (M83 song), a song by French electronic music band M83 from their 2011 album, Hurry Up, We're Dreaming
 "Outro", a song by American rock band Breaking Benjamin from their 2006 album, Phobia
 "Outro", a song by American rapper Big Sean from his 2015 album, Dark Sky Paradise
 "Outro", a song by American rapper Obie Trice from his 2003 album, Cheers
 "Outro", a song by American rapper Pitbull from his 2006 album, El Mariel
 "Outro", a song by American rapper Pop Smoke from his 2021 album, Faith
 "Outro", a song by American rap group Death Grips from their 2018 album Year of the Snitch
 "Outro", a track on rapper Reks' 2012 album REBELutionary

See also
 Extro (disambiguation)
 Outroduction, a collection of B-Sides by The New Amsterdams
 Outros Lugares, an album by the Portuguese music composer António Pinho Vargas
 Outrospective, an album by Faithless
 Outrospective / Reperspective
 The Intro and the Outro, a recording by The Bonzo Dog Doo-Dah Band